Andrew Joseph Tiongson (born June 15, 1967) is a United States Coast Guard vice admiral. Vice Admiral Tiongson has served concurrently as Commander, Pacific Area and Commander, Defense Force West since July 8, 2022. He most recently served as the Director of Operations (J3) at the United States Southern Command and was previously Commander of the Coast Guard First District. In his first flag assignment, he served as the Coast Guard's Chief Financial Officer and Assistant Commandant for Resources .

He was promoted to his present rank of vice admiral on June 11, 2022.

References

External links

|-

1967 births
Military personnel from Maine
Living people
United States Coast Guard admirals
Recipients of the Defense Superior Service Medal